The ITF Junior Circuit is the premier level for worldwide competition among under-18 junior tennis players. Founded in 1977 with only nine tournaments, the 2011 ITF Junior Circuit offered over 350 tournaments in 118 countries. Mirroring the ATP and WTA circuits, the ITF Junior Circuit ranks players and crowns a year end world champion.

History
The ITF Junior Circuit is organized by the International Tennis Federation. Since its creation it has been the beginning of many successful careers. Some Junior World Champions that have gone on to achieve great success on the pro tour include Ivan Lendl, Pat Cash, Gabriela Sabatini, Martina Hingis, Marcelo Ríos, Andy Roddick, Amélie Mauresmo, Roger Federer, and many more. From 1982 through 2003, the ITF Junior Circuit recognized Year End Champions in singles and doubles. Beginning in 2004, the rankings were combined and a single champion in both boys' and girls' competition was recognized.

Tournament grades
Just like the ATP and WTA, junior tournaments are divided into different levels. The highest level tournaments are the junior grand slams and the Youth Olympics, followed by the ITF Junior Masters, an event that resembles the year-end finals. The five Grade A tournaments are the junior equivalent of the ATP Masters 1000 and WTA Premier Mandatory events in terms of points awarded relative to the grand slams. In calendar order, these are the Copa Gerdau, the Trofeo Bonfiglio, the Osaka Mayor's Cup, the Abierto Juvenil Mexicano, and the Orange Bowl. All remaining tournaments are assigned Grades 1 through 5. Tournaments labeled B1 through B3 refer to regional tournaments.

The ITF mostly recently changed the points system in 2018. The new system is designed to give the higher-level Grade A and Grade 1 tournaments more weight, and to reward players who progress deeper into tournaments regardless of the level. It also elevated the junior grand slams, the Youth Olympics, and the ITF Junior Masters above the Grade A level, which was previously the highest tier. Lastly, Grade B tournaments now award the same points as their non-regional counterparts with the same grade number instead of a slightly higher amount like they did before.

The ITF rankings system combines both singles and doubles results. However, doubles results are underweighted by a factor of one-fourth. Additionally, only the best six results in singles and the best six results in doubles count towards a player's ranking. The point distribution for each level of tournament is as follows:

Note: The ITF Junior Masters awards 320, 250 for 3rd–4th place, and 200, 185, 165, 150 for 5th–8th place.

Junior Exempt project
In 1997, the ITF began the Junior Exempt project to help the world's top junior girls to transition to the professional level. The Junior Exempt project provides wild cards into ITF Women's Circuit events to the girls who ended the year in the top 10 of the world rankings. The number and tournament level of wild cards received depends on how high a player finishes in the top 10. Beginning with the 2007 season, the Junior Exempt project expanded to include the top 10 Boys, who receive wild cards into Futures events.

Since 2018, ITF World Tennis Tour (former Futures) $15,000 tournaments reserve places in the main draw for top players in the ITF Junior Circuit.

References

External links 
 Homepage of ITF Junior Tennis

 
Tennis tours and series
Junior tennis
International Tennis Federation